Miranda Junior College is a pre-university college in  Bangalore, Karnataka, India. It is affiliated to Bangalore University. It is located at HAL 3rd Stage, Jeevan Bhima Nagar in Indira Nagar

Streams offered
The College offers courses in the below mentioned science streams
1. PCMB - Physics, Chemistry, Mathematics, Biology
2. PCMC - Physics, Chemistry, Mathematics, Computer Science 
3. CEBA - Computer Science, Economics, Business Studies, Accountancy
4. BEBA - Basic Mathematics, Economics, Business Studies, Accountancy

Facilities
1.	Classrooms with audio-visual facility
2.	Canteen
3.	Transportation Facilities

References

Pre University colleges in Karnataka
High schools and secondary schools in Bangalore